San Carlos Cathedral, officially known as the San Carlos Borromeo Cathedral Parish, is a 20th-century Eclectic Roman Catholic cathedral parish dedicated to Saint Charles Borromeo, located in the city proper of San Carlos, Negros Occidental, region of Western Visayas, Philippines. In 1987, it became the cathedral of the Diocese of San Carlos which comprises northeastern Negros Occidental and northern Negros Oriental.

History
The city of San Carlos was once a small Negrito community area named Nabingkalan. In 1856, the said settlement was renamed San Carlos and was made a pueblo by the Spanish government. San Carlos received its first parish priest in 1892, appointed by the Bishop of Jaro.

Under the helm of Fr. Leoncio Reta in 1928, the groundbreaking was held and the construction of the church of San Carlos was begun. Lack of funds, however, became the reason of the delay of the construction of the solid foundation and a few meters of the walls. Fr. Manuel Gomara wanted no more delay in the construction of the church and so in May 1935, he sought the help of the hacenderos of San Carlos: the Gamboas, Broces, Llantadas, and the Menchacas. Don Julio Ledesma eventually donated 20,000 pesos for the construction project after the initial 12,000 peso budget was deemed insufficient. The construction of the church thereafter resumed. Dr. Cerada drew the blueprint of the church, and its construction was supervised by architect Angel Locsin Yulo. The finished church was consecrated and inaugurated on Saint Charles Borromeo's feast day in 1935.

References

External links
 Facebook page 

Roman Catholic churches in Negros Occidental
Roman Catholic cathedrals in the Philippines
19th-century Roman Catholic church buildings in the Philippines
20th-century Roman Catholic church buildings in the Philippines
Neo-Byzantine architecture
Romanesque Revival church buildings in the Philippines
Gothic Revival church buildings in the Philippines
Buildings and structures in San Carlos, Negros Occidental